The 1970 ABC Junior Championship for Women was the women's division of the inaugural edition of the Asian Basketball Confederation (ABC)'s junior championship or the Asian Youth Basketball Championship. The games were held at the Jangchung Arena in Seoul, South Korea from August 25–September 2, 1970. The age restriction was under 19.

Only three nations participated; nevertheless, the hosts  won the inaugural championship by sweeping all of their assignments, defeating  and  twice. Japan and Taiwan were tied with win–loss record of 1–3, but Japan took second place by head-to-head records.

Results

Final standing

Awards

See also
 1970 ABC Junior Championship

References

External links
 Squad for South Korea  

1970
Under
1970 in women's basketball
International women's basketball competitions hosted by South Korea
Bask
Bask